Zadoc (also spelt Zadock, Zadok, Sadok, Sadaqat or Sadokat) is a given name (first name), originally from Hebrew, meaning "just" or "righteous". It was originally the name of several biblical figures.

People with this name

S 
 Sadok (–1260), a Christian martyr
Sadok Barącz (1814–1892), a Dominican friar from Galicia
Sadok Bey (1813–1882), better known as Muhammad III as-Sadiq, monarch of Tunisia
Sadok Chaabane (1950–), general director of a Tunisian university
Sadok Ghileb (1840–1912), mayor of Tunis
Sadok Khalgui (1978), Tunisian judoka
Sadokat Ruzieva (1984–), former member of Uzbekistan's national women's football team
Sadok Sassi (1945–), former Tunisian footballer
Sadok Touj (1996–), Tunisian footballer)
Z
Zadok, Hebrew High Priest of King David and King Solomon
Zadoc P. Beach (1861-??), American politician
 Zadok Ben-David (born 1949), Israeli artist
 Zadoc Benedict, American businessman
 Zadok Casey (1796–1862), American politician
 Zadock Cook (1769–1863), American politician
 Zadoc Dederick, American inventor
 Zadok Domnitz (born 1933), Israeli chess player
 Zadok HaKohen (1823–1900), Polish rabbi
 Zadoc Kahn (1839–1905), French rabbi
 Zadok Magruder (1729–1811), American farmer and patriot
 Zadok Malka (born 1964), Israeli football player
 Zadock Pratt (1790–1871), American tanner and politician
 Zadock Thompson (1796–1856), American naturalist
 Zadoc Weatherford (1888–1983), American politician

See also 
Tzadik, the Jewish religious title, and the derived first names

References

English masculine given names
Hebrew masculine given names